Grand Duchess Alexandra Nikolaevna of Russia (24 June 1825 – 10 August 1844) was the youngest daughter and fourth child of Tsar Nicholas I, Emperor of Russia, and his wife, Princess Charlotte of Prussia. She was a younger sister of Tsar Alexander II of Russia.

Biography
She was the namesake of her paternal aunt, Grand Duchess Alexandra Pavlovna, who died in childbirth along with her stillborn daughter in 1801, but in the family she was known by her affectionate nickname, "Adini". According to her sister Olga's memoirs, Alexandra had inherited her mother's "Prussian look". It was also said that she resembled her late maternal grandmother, Queen Louise of Prussia. Nicholas affectionately spoke of Adini as "... a little moppet, but very sweet".

Alexandra was famous in Saint Petersburg society for both her wit and her lively personality. She was also the musician in the family.  A serious student of vocal music, she was talented enough to qualify for lessons from the famous soprano Henriette Sontag.

Marriage

On 28 January 1844, Alexandra married Prince Frederick William of Hesse (1820–1884) in St. Petersburg. Her husband was the only son of Prince William of Hesse and Princess Louise Charlotte of Denmark. Since childhood he lived in Copenhagen with his parents and was regarded as one of the strongest candidates as heir to the Danish throne as there was a lack of direct male heirs in the royal family. Thus it was important for him to find a wife that could back his claim. "Fritz", as he was called, had come to St. Petersburg as a prospective bridegroom for Olga, but fell in love with Adini instead on the first evening he spent with the family. Although Olga was the elder daughter and also found Fritz to be an engaging young man, she graciously stepped aside in favour of her sister, and even chaperoned the couple when they wanted to spend time together away from the prying eyes of the court. The emperor and empress then gave their permission for Alexandra and Fritz to be married. Frederick's uncle, king Christian VIII of Denmark purchased Dehn Mansion in Copenhagen and Bernstorff Palace outside the city for the newlyweds and there was great joy over the union in the royal family.

Alexandra became acutely ill with tuberculosis shortly before her wedding, and this complicated the pregnancy which soon followed. She was never well enough to travel to Hesse and take up her new position with her husband. They stayed in St. Petersburg, where her health rapidly declined.

She went into labor prematurely, three months before the child was due, and gave birth to a son, Wilhelm. The infant died shortly after he was born, and Alexandra died later the same day. She was the first of her parents' children to die. Her parents were devastated and their grief would last until the end of their lives. She was buried  at the Peter and Paul Fortress in St. Petersburg. Her son was buried in Rumpenheim (Germany).

Nine years later, Fritz married Adini's first cousin, Princess Anna of Prussia (1836–1918), as his second wife.  Eventually he became head of the House of Hesse-Kassel.  Although they had six children together, Fritz and Anna were never emotionally close, and it is speculated that one reason was because Fritz was unable to overcome his grief for his first wife.

Legacy
In the gardens of the Petergof palace near Saint Petersburg there is a memorial bench with a small sculpture bust of the Grand Duchess.  Her rooms there have been preserved just as they were at the time of her death.

Six sheaves of wheat made of diamonds, which came to Hesse on one of the dresses in Alexandra's trousseau, were transformed into a tiara by Anna around 1900.  This tiara is now the traditional wedding tiara of the Hessian princely family, and was last worn by Floria of Faber-Castell when in 2003, she married Donatus, Hereditary Prince of Hesse, Adini's husband's great-great-grandson by his second marriage.

Ancestry

Sources 
 Hesse: A Princely German Collection.  Catalog of exhibition at the Portland Art Museum, 2005.  John E. Buchanan, Jr., Director, The Marilyn H. and Dr. Robert B. Pamplin, Jr. Collection.
 Olga, Queen of Wuerttemberg.  Traum der Jugend goldener Stern. Günther Neske Verlag, 1955.

External links 

1825 births
1844 deaths
Deaths in childbirth
House of Holstein-Gottorp-Romanov
Russian grand duchesses
House of Hesse-Kassel
19th-century people from the Russian Empire
19th-century women from the Russian Empire
Daughters of Russian emperors
Children of Nicholas I of Russia
Burials at Saints Peter and Paul Cathedral, Saint Petersburg